The William James Fellow Award is an award of the Association for Psychological Science which "honors APS Members for their lifetime of significant intellectual contributions to the basic science of psychology". The requirement is that "recipients must be APS members recognized internationally for their outstanding contributions to scientific psychology".  It is named after William James. As part of APS's 25th Anniversary, the APS Board of Directors recognized a larger class of William James Fellows in 2013, identifying them as individuals who have had a profound impact on the field of psychological science over the previous quarter century.

Recipients

1989
Robert P. Abelson
Mary D. Ainsworth
Solomon E. Asch
John W. Atkinson
Richard C. Atkinson
Albert Bandura
Roger G. Barker
James E. Birren
Gordon H. Bower
John Bowlby
Donald E. Broadbent
Roger L. Brown
Jerome S. Bruner
Donald T. Campbell
J. Douglas Carroll
A. Noam Chomsky
Lee J. Cronbach
Morton Deutsch
Russell L. De Valois
Irving T. Diamond
John H. Flavell
John Garcia
Wendell R. Garner
Eleanor J. Gibson
David M. Green
Ernest R. Hilgard
Julian Hochberg
Leo Hurvich
Dorothea Jameson
Irving L. Janis
Gunnar Johansson
Edward E. Jones
Jerome Kagan
Daniel Kahneman
Harold H. Kelley
Beatrice T. Lacey
John C. Lacey
Richard S. Lazarus
Alvin M. Liberman
Donald B. Lindsley
Frederic M. Lord
R. Duncan Luce
Eleanor E. Maccoby
David C. McClelland
James L. McGaugh
William J. McGuire
Paul Meehl
George A. Miller
Neal E. Miller
Brenda Milner
Walter Mischel
Mortimer Mishkin
Allen Newell
Carl Pfaffmann
Michael I. Posner
Floyd Ratliff
Robert A. Rescorla
Lorrin A. Riggs
Mark R. Rosenzweig
Julian B. Rotter
Stanley Schachter
Roger N. Shepard
Herbert A. Simon
B.F. Skinner
Richard L. Solomon
George Sperling
Roger W. Sperry
Saul Sternberg
Patrick Suppes
Philip Teitelbaum
Richard F. Thompson
Ledyard R. Tucker
Endel Tulving
Amos Tversky
Benton J. Underwood
Hans Wallach
Robert B. Zajonc

1990
Frances K. Graham
William K. Estes

1991
Emanuel Donchin
Martin E.P. Seligman

1993
E. Mavis Hetherington
Fergus I.M. Craik

1994
Hans J. Eysenck
Larry R. Squire

1995
Harold W. Stevenson
Jean J. Chapman
Loren Chapman

1996
Richard E. Nisbett
William T. Greenough

1997
Edward Taub
Richard Davidson

1998
Paul Ekman
Rochel Gelman
Timothy A. Salthouse

1999
Edward E. Smith

2000
E. Tory Higgins
Elizabeth S. Spelke

2001
Claude M. Steele
Elizabeth F. Loftus
Shelley E. Taylor

2002
Anne M. Treisman
Susan Carey

2003-2004
Jay McClelland
Lee D. Ross

2004-2005
David Premack
Robert Plomin

2005-2006
Charles R. Gallistel
Marcia K. Johnson

2006-2007
Elliot Aronson
Richard M. Shiffrin

2007-2008
David E. Meyer
Morris Moscovitch

2008-2009
Martha Farah
Susan T. Fiske

2010
Philip N. Johnson-Laird
Leslie Ungerleider

2011
Nancy Eisenberg
John Jonides
Daniel M. Wegner

2012
Ellen S. Berscheid
Elaine C. Hatfield
Henry L. Roediger III

2013
 John R. Anderson
 Linda Bartoshuk
 Roy F. Baumeister
 Marilynn B. Brewer
 Gerald L. Clore
 John M. Darley
 Judy DeLoache
 Ed Diener
 Uta Frith
 Anthony G. Greenwald
 Janellen Huttenlocher
 Larry L. Jacoby
 Patricia K. Kuhl
 Ellen Markman
 Bruce S. McEwen
 Douglas Medin
 Helen J. Neville
 Elissa L. Newport
 John A. Swets
 Allan R. Wagner

2014
 Robert W. Levenson
 Nora S. Newcombe
 Keith Rayner (psychologist)
 Terry E. Robinson

2015
 Michael S. Gazzaniga
 Susan Goldin-Meadow
 Joseph E. LeDoux
 Timothy D. Wilson

2016
 Mahzarin Banaji
 Richard Ivry
 Steven Pinker

2017
 Daniel Schacter
 Robert Sternberg

2018
 John T. Cacioppo
 Jonathan D. Cohen

2019
 Daniel T. Gilbert
 Lynn Nadel
 Elizabeth A. Phelps
 Janet F. Werker

See also

 List of psychology awards

References

Association for Psychological Science
American psychology awards